Jamie Ling (born February 22, 1973) is a Canadian former professional ice hockey player.

Prior to turning professional, Ling attended the University of Notre Dame where he played four seasons of NCAA Division I college hockey with the Notre Dame Fighting Irish men's ice hockey team. As a freshman, Ling led the 1992–93 Fighting Irish team in scoring with 70 points in his rookie season.

Career statistics

Awards and honours

References

External links

1973 births
Living people
Baton Rouge Kingfish players
Canadian ice hockey centres
Chesapeake Icebreakers players
Cincinnati Cyclones (IHL) players
Cleveland Barons (2001–2006) players
Dayton Bombers players
Hershey Bears players
Ice hockey people from Prince Edward Island
Indianapolis Ice players
Kansas City Blades players
Milwaukee Admirals players
Mobile Mysticks players
Notre Dame Fighting Irish men's ice hockey players
Notre Dame Hounds players
Sportspeople from Charlottetown